"The Chathams" is a term used in reference to shared services for two neighboring municipalities in Morris County, New Jersey, United States – Chatham Borough and Chatham Township. The two are separate municipalities. The first, a town that was settled in 1710 as a colonial English village in the Province of New Jersey, that in 1773 adopted a name change to "Chatham". 

There are numerous references to this village as "Chatham, New Jersey" dating from that time. The second, more southern, without a town center, and less densely populated, is the vestige of a regional government that was formed in 1806 as a township, a form of municipal government peculiar to the state of New Jersey. It had jurisdiction over a region including a large area of open space and several villages. One of those, the village of Chatham, dating from 1710, was the source for its name, Chatham Township.

Chatham Township shares various joint public services with Chatham Borough: the school district, the library, the municipal court, the medical emergency squad, and recreation program.

In 2012, Forbes.com listed Chatham as 375th in its listing of "America's Most Expensive ZIP Codes", with a median home price of $776,703. In March 2018, Bloomberg ranked Chatham as the 64th wealthiest place in the United States, and the 8th wealthiest in New Jersey.

History

The newly established, post-revolutionary war, state of New Jersey went through several stages setting out how its local governments would be structured. Once boroughs became available after 1878, Chatham Township lost all but one of the villages between 1889 and 1899, including Chatham Borough (settled in 1710), that had been drawn into it in 1806 as they seceded.

Only Green Village, another early town like Chatham that dates to colonial times, was left under jurisdiction of "Chatham Township".

On August 19, 1892, the citizens of Chatham reincorporated with another type of village government offered as an alternative within townships by New Jersey. The village of Chatham then reincorporated for governance as a borough by an Act of the New Jersey Legislature on March 1, 1897 with complete independence from Chatham Township.

Shared services
Chatham Township shares various joint public services with Chatham Borough: the school district (created in 1986), the library (since 1974), the municipal court (created 2010), the medical emergency squad (since 1936), and the decades long, recreation program.

Public schools

Chatham Borough and Chatham Township held elections in November 1986 to consider joining their separate school districts. This proposal was supported by the voters of both municipalities and they now share a regionalized school district, the School District of the Chathams.

Elementary schools
 Milton Avenue School. Grades Pre-K - 3. Principal - Nicholas "Nick" Andreazza. For the 2014-15 school year, the Milton Avenue School was recognized with a Blue Ribbon School Award by the United States Department of Education, the highest award an American school can receive.
 Southern Boulevard School. Grades K - 3. Principal - Marco Freyre.
 Washington Avenue School. Grades K - 3. Acting Principal - Kristen Crawford.
 Lafayette School. Grades 4 & 5. Principal - Cheryl Russo.

Middle school
 Chatham Middle School Grades 6 - 8. Principal - Jill Gihorski. Vice Principals - Peter "Pete" Trebour and Anthony Giaconia.

High school
Chatham High School. Grades 9 - 12. Principal - Douglas "Doug" Walker. Vice Principals - Lori Gironda, Connor Henderson and Sean Devine.

For the 2004-05 school year, the high school was recognized with a Blue Ribbon School Award by the United States Department of Education, the highest award an American school can receive.

The school was the 20th-ranked public high school in New Jersey out of 328 schools statewide in New Jersey Monthly magazine's September 2012 cover story on the state's "Top Public High Schools", after being ranked 8th in 2010 out of 322 schools listed. It was the 12th-ranked public high school in New Jersey out of 316 schools statewide, in New Jersey Monthly magazine's September 2006 cover story on the state's Top Public High Schools.

Library

A library was founded in Chatham Borough in 1907. Located in a number of different shared buildings, a site for a separate building for the library was chosen after the Fairview Hotel on Main Street burned down. The hotel land was bought after a borough-wide solicitations of funds that was proposed by Charles M. Lum, after whose family Lum Avenue is named, and a brick building was constructed to house the library. John H. Eastwood of Belleville, New Jersey, a client of R. E. Lum, bequeathed $30,000 upon his death in 1924 for the construction of the library as a memorial to his own father, John H. Eastwood Sr., and Ralph E. Lum’s father, Frederick H. Lum, who were close friends. The building was dedicated as the Chatham Public Library, and it opened to the public in 1924. Residents of Chatham Borough were able to join. This location continues to house the library.

As the population of Chatham Township began to grow in the 1960s, services were extended to students in the township elementary school. In 1974, a referendum was placed on the November ballot for Jointure, which was to form a library for both towns.  The measure passed and the library began to serve all township residents as well. The library, renamed the Library of The Chathams, now serves both municipalities.

The library is administered by six trustees, who are appointed jointly by the councils of both municipalities and their mayors (or their representatives), as well as a representative from the joint school district.

In 1985 the library joined the Morris Automated Information Network (MAIN), an electronic database linking together all the public libraries in Morris County. An expansion costing nearly $4,000,000 (with the governments of both Chatham Borough and Chatham Township contributing a combined $2,000,000) was completed and dedicated on January 11, 2004.

The library also has a 9/11 memorial with 7 doves to represent the 7 citizens who lost their lives on that tragic day in New York City.

Municipal court
Chatham Township and Chatham Borough are members of the Borough of Madison Joint Municipal Court, which also has jurisdiction over Harding Township. The joint court was created in 2010 and is located in Madison.

Emergency squad
The Chatham Emergency Squad, which operates from two buildings, one in the Borough and one in the Township, provides emergency and non-emergency response for medical services, assistance for seniors and the disabled, and ambulance transportation to area hospitals and local nursing homes. All volunteer, squad members are certified by the state of New Jersey as Emergency Medical Technicians (EMTs).

When first established in 1936, it drew its members from the Chatham Fire Department. Its limited membership made it unable to meet the increasing demand for its growing services for Chatham Borough and Chatham Township.

In early 1951, the Chatham Borough Council was petitioned to authorize reorganization of the Squad as a unit independent of the Fire Department. The Chatham Emergency Squad, Inc. was then established as an independent corporation. It could then draw on regular citizens from the Chathams for membership.

Recreation
The Chatham Recreation is a joint venture of Chatham Borough Recreation and Chatham Township Recreation. It coordinates its activities with the Chatham Borough Council, the Chatham Township Committee, and the School District of the Chathams.

It offers a variety of indoor and outdoor recreational and sports activities at various municipal buildings, parks, fields, gyms, and school locations. It employs volunteers for supervision and refereeing of these activities.

Notes

Sources
 The New Jersey municipal data book ed. by Ruth R. Hornor. Palo Alto, CA: Information Publications, 2005. Entries on Chatham Borough and Chatham Township.

External links
 School District of the Chathams website
 
 School District of the Chathams, National Center for Education Statistics

Chatham Borough, New Jersey
Chatham Township, New Jersey